Park Ki-woong (born February 13, 1985) is a South Korean actor. He is best known for the TV series The Slingshot (2009) and Bridal Mask (2012), Return (2018) and Rookie Historian Goo Hae-ryung (2019) as well as the films My Tutor Friend 2 (2007) and Secretly, Greatly (2013).

Career
Park Ki-woong made his entertainment debut in the 2004 K2 music video "Giving You Love," then launched his acting career in 2005. He rose to stardom for being the "mill dance (맷돌춤)" guy in a 2006 SKY PMP Phone commercial. After a series of supporting roles on TV and film, Park starred in his first leading role in the 2007 romantic comedy My Tutor Friend 2, but the film wasn't commercially successful. In 2008, he became the honorary ambassador of his hometown Andong.

The Slingshot (2009) gave Park his first acting accolades. Critics and viewers praised his portrayal of an autistic genius who transforms into the best stock market analyst in the country. His other notable roles include an invading Manchurian prince in period action film War of the Arrows (2011); a sociopathic Japanese officer in colonized Korea in Bridal Mask (2012); and an elite North Korean spy undercover as a rock musician in box office hit Secretly, Greatly (2013).

In July 2013, Park released the EP You Are My Baby as a special gift to his fans. He also wrote the lyrics of the title song "You Are My Baby" which featured Younha. Park then joined the newly launched reality/variety show Beating Hearts (also known as Heart Is Beating) in September 2013, which follows six celebrities as they undergo the process of becoming firefighters and EMTs.

Park next appeared in the Kim Ki-duk-produced film Made in China. But before its release, he enlisted for his mandatory military service on May 8, 2014. After undergoing basic training, Park was assigned as a policeman for 21 months.

Following his discharge, Park made a comeback in MBC's revenge melodrama Monster. He was next cast in the big-screen adaptation of popular webcomic Cheese in the Trap, playing the role of a musical genius.

In 2018, Park starred in mystery thriller Return.

In 2019, Park joined Jellyfish Entertainment, home of artists such as gugudan. The same year, he was also cast in the historical drama Rookie Historian Goo Hae-ryung.

In March 2021, Park signed with the Mountain Movement, making his debut as a painter. later in April Park joins the original wave drama You Raise Me Up with Yoon Shi-yoon and Ahn Hee-yeon.

Filmography

Film

Television series

Web series

Television shows

Web shows

Music video

Discography

EP

Soundtrack

Awards and nominations

References

External links
 
 
 
 

South Korean male television actors
South Korean male film actors
1985 births
Living people
People from Andong
South Korean male models
South Korean Christians
21st-century South Korean male actors